Carl Duane (June 25, 1902 – June 23, 1984) also known as the "Bronx Steamroller", was an American boxer in the super bantamweight division who held the World Super Bantamweight Championship. 
During his career, Duane defeated such men as Charlie Phil Rosenberg, Lou Herley, Danny Edwards, Harry London, Young Montreal, Mickey Brown, Frankie Conway and Jack "Kid" Wolfe. He was managed by Mike Valentine.

Professional career
Carl was born in New York City on June 25, 1902. His first professional fight was against Silent LaMont on April 6, 1921 winning by decision.
In 1923 of August, he met Jack "Kid" Wolfe for the World Super bantamweight championship. Duane won over 12 rounds by unanimous decision.

Duane ended his career in 1929 after his decision loss to Al Singer. His overall record was 65 fights with 43 wins by decision and 13 by knockouts, 16 losses and 6 draw decisions. Duane was inducted into the New Jersey Boxing Hall of fame, posthumously, in 1984, shortly after his death career. Duane was featured on the cover of the March 1924 issue of The Ring magazine.

See also
List of super bantamweight boxing champions

References 

|-

External links
 

1902 births
1984 deaths
Boxers from New York (state)
Super-bantamweight boxers
Sportspeople from New York (state)
American male boxers